Podolanka may refer to:

Podolanka, Czech Republic
 Podolanka, Poland
Podolanka (book), 1784 novel by Michał Dymitr Krajewski